Leclercqia is the scientific name of two genera of organisms and may refer to:

Leclercqia (plant), a prehistoric genus of lycophytes
Leclercqia (wasp), a genus of wasps in the family Crabronidae